Ray Nilsson (born 26 November 1938) is a former Australian rules footballer who played for Melbourne and South Melbourne in the VFL during the early 1960s.

Nilsson was used as a rover and in the forward pocket at Melbourne but played as a wingman when he crossed to South Melbourne in 1964. He had been a member of Melbourne's 1960 premiership team, coming off the bench. A good performer in finals football, he kicked a career high four goals in the 1962 Semi Final against Carlton at the MCG.

References
Holmesby, Russell and Main, Jim (2007). The Encyclopedia of AFL Footballers. 7th ed. Melbourne: Bas Publishing.

External links

1938 births
Australian rules footballers from Victoria (Australia)
Melbourne Football Club players
Sydney Swans players
Living people
Melbourne Football Club Premiership players
One-time VFL/AFL Premiership players